Pteroplatidius octocostatus is a species of beetle in the family Cerambycidae, the only species in the genus Pteroplatidius.

References

Trachyderini
Monotypic beetle genera